Coxsackie is a town in Greene County, New York, United States. The population in the 2020 census was 8,382, a decrease from the 2010 census. The name of the town is said to be derived from a Native American term, but it has various translations ("owl's hoot" is locally common).

Within the area governed as a town, there is also a village called Coxsackie. The town is in the northeastern part of the county.

The town of Coxsackie is notable for being the namesake of the Coxsackievirus (a type of enterovirus), which was first isolated in this town.

History 
The settlement of Coxsackie began in the seventeenth century, in approximately 1652, as part of the development of New Netherland. The government of the area became established as a district in 1772, and Coxsackie was founded in 1788 with a town form of government. Part of Coxsackie was lost when the town of Durham was formed in 1790. Further land was lost in the formation of the newer towns of Cairo and Greenville (1803), New Baltimore (1811), and Athens (1815).

One of the first settlers in Coxsackie was Pieter Bronck, of the same family for which the Bronx is named. In 1663, he built the Pieter Bronck House in West Coxsackie, which is open as a museum. The nearby family burial ground includes a separate plot with marked graves for slaves of the family.

Geography
According to the United States Census Bureau, the town has a total area of 38.4 square miles (99.4 km2), of which 36.9 square miles (95.6 km2) is land and 1.5 square miles (3.8 km2, or 3.86%) is water.

The eastern town line is defined by the Hudson River and is the border of Columbia County.

The New York State Thruway (Interstate 87) and U.S. Route 9W pass through the town.

Demographics

2000
As of the census of 2000, there were 8,918 people, 2,422 households, and 1,583 families residing in the town. The population density was 240.8 people per square mile (93.0/km2). There were 2,789 housing units at an average density of 75.6 per square mile (29.2/km2). The racial makeup of the town was 92.24% White, 5.33% Black or African American, 0.30% Native American, 0.61% Asian, 0.02% Pacific Islander, 0.85% from other races, and 0.64% from two or more races. Hispanic or Latino of any race were 11.15% of the population.

There were 2,422 households, out of which 31.3% had children under the age of 18 living with them, 49.9% were married couples living together, 10.6% had a female householder with no husband present, and 34.6% were non-families. 28.0% of all households were made up of individuals, and 11.8% had someone living alone who was 65 years of age or older. The average household size was 2.46 and the average family size was 3.01.

In the town, the population was spread out, with 18.7% under the age of 18, 24.3% from 18 to 24, 29.9% from 25 to 44, 18.3% from 45 to 64, and 8.8% who were 65 years of age or older. The median age was 30 years. For every 100 females, there were 185.9 males. For every 100 females age 18 and over, there were 210.9 males.

The median income for a household in the town was $37,830, and the median income for a family was $46,189. Males had a median income of $37,823 versus $26,859 for females. The per capita income for the town was $16,830. About 9.5% of families and 12.9% of the population were below the poverty line, including 15.7% of those under age 18 and 16.2% of those age 65 or over.

Communities and locations in the town of Coxsackie 
Bronck House – A house in West Coxsackie built by Pieter Bronck in 1663 (open as a museum)
Coxsackie – The village of Coxsackie
Reed Street Historic District is a national historic district located in Coxsackie's village proper on the west bank of the Hudson River, Greene County. The district contains 30 contributing buildings. They are a collection of mid-19th century, two and three story commercial buildings. The district displays a uniformity of style in its Italianate style brick facades with ornate brackets and overhanging eaves. Recently, new, independently owned businesses have opened on Reed Street bringing Coxsackie's historic downtown back to life: Mansion + Reed General Store (a specialty grocery and cafe), Reed Street Bottle Shop (a wine and spirits shop), Pilothouse Paper (specialty paper and home goods), Mahalo Toyshop (gifts for kids and kids at heart), Heart Land Realty, Che Figata (an Italian Bistro), and the Yellow Deli (a deli serving breakfast and lunch).
Riverside Park- located at the end of Reed Street in Coxsackie Village. This park offers expansive views of the mighty Hudson River. A boat launch allows easy load-in and load-out for motor boats, canoes, and kayaks (with plenty of parking). Seasonal docks are put out for warm season fishing and sunning. A Farmer's Market is held here  on Wednesday evenings during the summer months of May to October- offering farm produce and goods, a weekly visiting food truck, and live music. 
Climax – A hamlet northwest of Coxsackie village on Route 81
Earlton – A hamlet in the western part of the town. The Forestville Commonwealth Owenite community at Earlton was listed on the National Register of Historic Places in 1974.
Hudson River Islands State Park
Surprise – A hamlet at the western town line. 
Sleepy Hollow Lake – A lake partly in the southern part of the town (a "resort" development)
West Coxsackie – A hamlet northwest of Coxsackie village on Route 81
Coxsackie Correctional Facility – A state prison southwest of Coxsackie village
Greene Correctional Facility -a state prison adjacent to Coxsackie Correctional Facility

References

External links
Town of Coxsackie official website
Coxsackie Town Court
 Heermance Memorial Library (Coxsackie)
Village of Coxsackie

Towns in Greene County, New York
1788 establishments in New York (state)
New York (state) populated places on the Hudson River